The I.ČLTK Prague Open  is a tennis tournament held in Prague, the capital of the Czech Republic. The tournament has been part of the ATP Challenger Tour since 1991 (with an interruption in the years 2000,  2009–10) and part of the ITF Women's World Tennis Tour since 1995.

The I.ČLTK Prague Open has been held at the tennis arena onto Štvanice island on I. Czech Lawn Tennis Club.

Starting in 2015, a women's tournament was held in addition to the men's tournament and was part of the ITF Women's Circuit. 

Jan Hernych is the singles record holder with three titles. Michal Tabara, Lukáš Rosol and Horacio Zeballos are the only three to win both singles and doubles in the same year.

Development of the name

1991–1999: (Czech Open, Skoda Czech Open) women; (TBD) men
2001–2010: ECM Prague Open
2011: Strabag Prague Open
2012: CNGvitall Prague Open
2013–2019: Advantage Cars Prague Open
2020–present: I.ČLTK Prague Open

Past finals

Men

Singles

Doubles

Women

Singles

Doubles

See also
 Prague Open (1987–1999)
 1992 HTC Prague Open
 BVV Prague Open
 1996 Pupp Czech Open
 Sparta Prague Open Challenger
 Neridé Prague Indoor
 Czech Indoor Open
 WTA Prague Open

 List of tennis tournaments

References

External links
 Official website - June 2014 Tournament 
 Archived results on ATP website

 
Tennis tournaments in the Czech Republic
Sports competitions in Prague
Clay court tennis tournaments
ATP Challenger Tour
ITF Women's World Tennis Tour
Recurring sporting events established in 1992
1992 establishments in Czechoslovakia
I.ČLTK Prague Open